Pannonian Romance was spoken by Romanized Celtic and Illyrian peoples that developed in Pannonia, between modern-day Vienna and Belgrade, after the fall of the Western Roman Empire. Despite the Romanized population being mentioned in several annals, no works of literature and few traces in modern languages survive.

The language suffered many setbacks under Hunnic, Germanic, Avar, Slavic, Turkic and Magyar (Hungarian) invaders and new overlords, triggering waves of emigration. Nevertheless, it probably lasted until the 10th century in isolated settlements. The demise of Pannonian Romance shows some similarities with that of other Romance languages that were replaced and assimilated in Great Britain, Africa and Germany, lasting only a few centuries.

History

The Romanized population of Pannonia (for which the historian Theodor Mommsen calculated a population of about 200,000, around the 4th century) survived Barbarian invasions (by the Huns, Goths, Avars and others), although they were reduced to a few thousands by the 6th century, living mainly in fortified villages, like Keszthely and Fenékpuszta.

There were other places in Pannonia where the local population continued to speak forms of Vulgar Latin after the 5th century: Pécs, Sopron, Szombathely, Dunaújváros. Many Christian relics with inscriptions in Latin have been found in these towns.

But it was on the western shore of Lake Balaton where a peculiar society of craftsmen formed, called the Keszthely culture, of which more than 6,000 artisan tombs and many products (including in gold) are left.

Romance dialects disappeared, due to assimilation with German and Slavic invaders in border areas of the Roman limes near the Danube trunk in Pannonia, Raetia (today, Bavaria and Switzerland) and Noricum (today, Austria), but in the former Pannonian provinces Romance-speaking herders and a population of skilled artisans and craftsmen survived around in the area of Lake Balaton.

Nominal control of the area switched between Huns, Gepids and Lombards, Avars, Moravians and Franks after the Avars were defeated by Charlemagne. Part of the Roman population may have emigrated with the Lombards in 568 to Italy, particularly from settlements that lay directly on the Amber Road. The Franks document some of their missionary activity and efforts to incorporate Pannonia into their empire including in the Annales regni Francorum. The  that describes the Hungarians conquest from the year 900 of the area, describes four ethnicities upon the arrival of the Magyars in Pannonia. In the chapter , the  names Slavs, Bulgars (Turkic) and makes a distinction between Vlachs and the Pastoral Romans, the Romanized Pannonians.

Translation: 'But they begged the alms-leader, that having given up the land of Galicia, they should go down beyond the forest of Houos towards the west into the land of Pannonia, which at first had been the land of King Attila. And they said that the land of Pannonia was exceedingly good. For they said that the most noble springs of water converged there, the Danube and the Tiscia, and other most noble springs abounding in good fish. This land were inhabited by slaves, Bulgarians and Blachii (i.e Vlachs), and shepherds of the Romans. Because after the death of King Attila, the Romans said that the land of Pannonia was a pasture, because their flocks were grazing in the land of Pannonia. And by right the land of Pannonia was said to be the pasture of the Romans, for in that way the Romans feed on the goods of Hungary.'

The grave inscriptions and mentions of the language disappeared from the beginning of the 9th century, the Roman craftsmen of the Keszthely culture were assimilated, Roman pastoralists were no longer mentioned and the language, Pannonian Romance, soon disappeared with them in the 10th century.

Over time, researchers have pointed out the Pannonian Romance could have more likely been grouped with the Eastern Romance languages alongside the Daco-Romance languages. Other researchers pointed out that it could have shared a handful of similarities with the Dalmatian language of coastal Croatia.

Geographic distribution and demise
The area where and for how long the language was spoken can be hypothesised from written records, gravestone inscriptions, archaeological excavation of houses characterized by Romanized architecture and furnishings, oral tradition and linguistic remnants in successor languages.

Inner Pannonia 
Pannonian Romance was spoken around Lake Balaton in western Hungary, mainly in the fortified villages of Keszthely and Fenékpuszta.

Lower Limes 
Romanized tombs of Pannonians of the 6th century were found include: Pécs (the Roman Sopianae),
possibly in Szentendre (Castra Constantia) and Visegrád (Pote Navata), but unclear how much influence from Avar and Slavic-speakers. Speakers disappears or assimilated before 8th century Dunaújváros. Early Slavic and Avarian settlement activity was concentrated along the Danube south of Aquinicum (Buda), only expanding up river into the Roman towns after 6th century.

Upper Limes 
At the time of late Slavic and Avarian expansion up the Danube, Pannonia Superior towns still had a substantial Roman population as attested to by coin dated graves. In Tokod (Brigetio) the population had shrunk considerably in the 5th century, but can be attested into the 6th century. Carnuntum suffered a population collapse, after being transferred to Hun control and was described by a witness, Ammianus Marcellinus, as an abandoned and rotting nest, in the 5th century. The rest population of the area moved to settlements close to what would become Hainburg. Further up river on the Danube, Roman graves from 6th century of Vindobona were documented; and although Vienna had a continuous population, when the last Romanized inhabitants were assimilated after the 6th century is uncertain. Place names along the Tullnina rivers suggest a continued rural Roman population above Tulln. Many Roman town names are kept or adapted, Zeizinmure – Zeiselmauer,  – Vienna.

Along the Amber Road 
Romanized tombs of: Szombathely (Savaria), Sopron (Scarbantia), Hegykő and Oggau (until the 6th century).

Language

The name  could be related to the Istrian–Venetian , which means "castle", and is probably an original word of the Pannonian Romance language, according to the Austrian linguist Julius Pokorny.

According to Romanian linguist Alexandru Rosetti, Pannonian Romance probably contributed to the creation of the 300 basic words of the "Latin substratum" of the Balkan Romance languages.

Some scholars argue that the Pannonian Romance lacks clear evidences of existence, because no written sources exist. However, according to Árthur Sós, in some of the 6,000 tombs of the Keszthely culture, there are words in vernacular Latin. This is the case, for example, of a gold pin with the inscription .

See also
 African Romance
 Moselle Romance
 British Romance

Notes

Bibliography
 Du Nay, Andre. The Origins of the Rumanians—The early history of the Rumanian language. Matthias Corvinus Publishing. Toronto,1996
 Magdearu, Alexandru. Românii în opera Notarului Anonym. Centrul de Studii Transilvane, Bibliotheca Rerum Transsylvaniae, XXVII. Cluj-Napoca 2001.
 Mócsy, András. Pannonia and Upper Moesia: a history of the middle Danube provinces of the Roman Empire. Publisher Routledge. London, 1974 
 Mommsen, Theodore. The Provinces of the Roman empire. Barnes & Noble Books. New York 2003
 Remondon, Roger. La crise de l’Empire romain. Collection Nouvelle Clio – l’histoire et ses problèmes. Paris 1970
 Rosetti, Alexandru. "History of the Romanian language" (Istoria limbii române), 2 vols., Bucharest, 1965–1969.
 Sós, Árthur/Salamon Á. Cemeteries of the Early Middle Ages (6th-9 th c.) at Pókaszepetk. Ed by. B. M. Szőke. Budapest 1995.
 Szemerényi, Oswald. Studies in the Kinship Terminology of the Indo-European Languages. Leiden 1977
 Tagliavini, Carlo. Le origini delle lingue neolatine. Patron Ed. Bologna 1982

Eastern Romance languages
Extinct Romance languages
Pannonia